Trombone Champ is a 2022 trombone-based rhythm game developed and published by Holy Wow Studios, released on . Similar in gameplay to rhythm game titles Guitar Hero and Wii Music, players are tasked with timing their input to music note prompts as they appear on screen, with greater accuracy yielding more points and a higher score. The debut indie title reached widespread popularity on Steam after becoming an Internet meme. It was nominated for the British Academy Games Award for Debut Game.

Gameplay
Trombone Champ is a rhythm game in which players use a virtual trombone to play along to various songs, ranging from classical and public domain songs to original tracks and remixes. Players move the mouse to change the pitch of the trombone and use either the mouse button or keyboard keys to play. Players earn points by successfully hitting notes as they slide across the screen, with more points earned by maintaining successive combos and filling a meter that activates Champ Fever when filled, earning even more points. Missing notes, however, will cause the player to lose their combo multiplier and Champ Fever, as well as potentially lose points. Players will also momentarily run out of breath if they hold a note for too long. At the end of each song, players receive a rank from F to S based on their score, as well as an in-game currency known as Toots. Toots can be spent on in-game trading cards known as Tromboner Cards, which contain humorous and sometimes fictional trivia about musicians, trombones, and game lore. Unwanted or duplicate cards can be transformed into Turds, which can then be spent to create new cards. Hidden throughout the game are non-playable characters who assist the player in becoming the eponymous Trombone Champ. By fulfilling requests such as offering a certain amount of Toots or Turds or trading specific Tromboner Cards, players can unlock additional playable characters, trombone colors, and sound sets. There is also a secret boss level that requires certain conditions to fully defeat and claim the title of Trombone Champ.

Development
Creator Dan Vecchitto had long thought of an arcade video game based on moving a trombone-like slide controller, but the idea was always a joke. He later got the idea of using the mouse cursor to act as the trombone slide, and realized that there was a game concept behind that. His studio, Holy Wow Studios, was a group of part-time developers and while Vecchitto had thought it would take only about six months to realize the game, it ended up taking four years. Two features of the game forced the longer development time: the introduction of the Tromboner Cards, which was to parody loot box systems in other games, and a loose story involving baboons, which Vecchitto created in parody of the Dark Souls series' narratives.

The studio ran a small open playtesting of the game a month ahead of its planned release, from which they received a far greater amount of feedback than expected. When the game was first fully released in September 2022, the reaction to the game went viral, drawing in more players and feedback. Due to this, Vecchitto says they are considering more features as well as potential console ports of the game.

Track listing 
Developer Holy Wow Studios has expanded the number of playable tracks through free updates, and expressed interest in using future downloadable content to expand the tracklist as well.

  

In addition to the first-party included tracks listed above, there are many custom tracks which can be loaded into the game using unofficial mods. Notable examples include the DragonForce song "Through the Fire and Flames" and Sephiroth's theme "One-Winged Angel".

References 

Music video games
Rhythm games
2022 video games
Video games developed in the United States
Windows games
Internet memes introduced in 2022